Glyptotrox hamatus is a beetle of the family Trogidae.

References

Glyptotrox
Beetles described in 1940